Ṭarāblus or  Ṭarābulus (Arabic: طرابلس) is the Arabic form of Tripoli (Greek: Τρίπολις), often transliterated into Turkish as Trablus, and may refer to:

 Tripoli, Libya, historically Ṭarābulus al-Gharb ("Western Tripoli")
 Eyālet-i Trâblus Gârp (province, 1551–1864) of the Ottoman Empire, centered on the city
 Vilâyet-i Trâblus Gârp, name of the province between 1864–1911
 Tripoli, Lebanon, historically Ṭarābulus al-Sham ("Levantine Tripoli")
 Eyālet-i Trâblus Şam (province, 1579–1864) of the Ottoman Empire, centered on the city

See also
 Tripoli (disambiguation)